USS Parrot (AMS/MSC-197) was a  in the United States Navy for clearing coastal minefields.

Construction
Parrot was laid down 23 December 1953, as AMS–197, by Broward Marine, Inc., Fort Lauderdale, Florida; launched on 27 November 1954; sponsored by Mrs. S. Heuer; reclassified MSC–197 on 7 February 1955; and commissioned on 28 June 1955.

North Atlantic operations
After fitting out and training, Parrot, along with four other minesweepers, participated in cold weather minesweeping exercises in the North Atlantic. Parrot then moved to Charleston, South Carolina, her base for exercises and training operations in the Caribbean and the Gulf Stream. She remained there until January 1958, when she sailed north to participate in her first NATO exercise. In February 1958, Parrot was dispatched to the waters off Savannah, Georgia, to participate in a search for a nuclear weapon jettisoned by a bomber.  Upon completion, she returned to the Caribbean area where she remained into 1961, conducting training exercises and serving as training ship for the Mine Warfare School. In March 1961, she assisted in helping to evaluate the new helicopter method of minesweeping. After completion of this duty, she returned to her training and patrol duties.

On 22 October 1962, Parrot was ordered to get underway, with no destination being specified. She was later directed to assist in the Cuban Quarantine operation. After this duty, she returned to Charleston. Once again she resumed her training and patrolling duties. On 1 March 1963, she left Charleston with orders to search for the overdue . Finding nothing, Parrot returned to port on 18 March. Resuming patrol duties and training exercises, Parrot also made annual deployments to the Caribbean until August 1968.

Decommissioning and reassignment 
Decommissioned and placed in service on 26 September 1968, Parrot became a Naval Reserve Training Ship at Atlantic City. Placed out of service on 20 July 1972, and struck from the Naval Vessel Register on 1 August 1972, Parrot was sold by Defense Reutilization and Marketing Service for scrapping on 1 December 1976.

Notes 

Citations

Bibliography 

Online resources

External links 
 
 Unit Pages - USS Parrot (MSC-197)
 historycentral.com - USS Parrot (MSC-197)
 "Wooden Ships & Iron Men" : USS Parrot (MSC-197)

 

Bluebird-class minesweepers
Ships built in Fort Lauderdale, Florida
1954 ships
Cold War minesweepers of the United States
Adjutant-class minesweepers